Montalegre is a municipality in northern Portugal, located in the district of Vila Real, along the border with Spain. The population in 2011 was 10,537, in an area of 805.46 km².

History
Early construction in Montalegre date back 3500–4000 years when early inhabitants, around the villages of Mourela, Veiga and Vila da Ponte, buried their dead in funeral mounds. Vestiges of this culture predominate the region, and suggest that settlements have been ongoing since the Metal Ages.

Celt colonies began to appear afterward, constructing castros in many of the places that developed into formal settlements. With the arrival of the Romans, bridges and formal roads began to appear, while many of the castros began to be converted into Roman encampments, later the nuclei of formalized settlements. Remains of the Roman civitas are still common: Praesidium (in Vila da Ponte,  popularly known as Sabaraz) and Caladunum (in Cervos).

Although there were no overt indications that the Moors settled in this region, although oral tradition inferred as much.

With the establishment of the Christian kingdom of Portugal, Afonso Henriques donated portions of the land for charitable hospices (Salto), hospitals (Vilar de Perdizes and Dornelas) or monasteries (Pitões). Owing to its location, on the border with Galiza, defense fortifications were constructed, including the Castles of Gerês and Piconha, and later in Portelo and the village of Montalegre. A lighthouse was also constructed in Tourém, likely by King Sancho in 1187, since he was the master of the Terras da Piconha region.

It was only in September 1273 that King Afonso III bestowed on the citizens a foral (charter), founding the town of Montalegre and making the local sheriff the master of the Terras de Barroso. The foral was later confirmed by King Denis in 1289, and renewed by Afonso IV (in 1340), John II (in 1491), and Manuel (in 1515).

After the Portuguese Interregnum, during the reign of John I, the Terras de Barroso were offered as a gift to Nuno Álvares Pereira for his support.

In 1809, French troops had problems in the region, during the Peninsular Wars, fighting off the Barrosões, in Misarela.

On 6 November 1836, the municipality of Montalegre was divided, in order to create the municipality of Boticas. In course, the parishes of Vilar de Vacas was lost to the neighbouring municipality of Vieira do Minho, and later the parish of Couto Misto de Santiago de Rubiás, was also de-annexed.

Contemporary history of the municipality has been marked by growing emigration, the result of the lack of economic recourse and the abandonment of traditional activities. The institutionalization of local government permitted a revitalization in the municipality, after the Carnation Revolution, which saw a growth in tertiary activities.

Geography
 Montalegre is one of the two municipalities that compose the region of Barroso. The Peneda-Gerês National Park comprises 26,26% of its area (211,74 km² out of a total 806,19 km² belonging to that park).

Climate
There is a short dry season in summer, but overall plenty of precipitation annually.

Summers are pleasant and dry, and winters are chilly and snowy.

Human geography
Administratively, the municipality is divided into 27 civil parishes that administer local area government and support the local populations:

 Cabril
 Cambeses do Rio, Donões e Mourilhe
 Cervos
 Chã
 Covelo do Gerês
 Ferral
 Frades do Rio
 Gralhas
 Meixedo e Padornelos
 Montalegre e Padroso
 Morgade
 Negrões
 Outeiro
 Paradela, Contim e Fiães
 Peireses
 Pitões das Júnias
 Reigoso
 Salto
 Santo André
 Sarraquinhos
 Sezelhe e Covelães
 Solveira
 Tourém
 Venda Nova e Pondras
 Viade de Baixo e Fervidelas
 Vila da Ponte
 Vilar de Perdizes e Meixide

Notable people 
 Delfim Modesto Brandão (1835–??) the penultimate "Juiz" (head of state) of the micro-state of Couto Misto which lasted 4 years from 1864.
 Bento António Gonçalves (1902–1942) the second Secretary General of the Portuguese Communist Party.
 Juan Rodríguez Cabrillo, first European to reach California

See also
Montalegre Castle
Couto Misto

References

 
Towns in Portugal
Municipalities of Vila Real District